Rafael Antonio Hernando Fraile (born 13 November 1961) is a Spanish attorney and politician who represents Almería Province in the Spanish Congress of Deputies. He was the spokesperson of the People's Party in Congress between 2014 and 2018. He has also been the President of New Generations.

Hernando was born in Guadalajara, Castile-La Mancha.

References

1961 births
Guadalajara, Spain municipal councillors
Living people
Members of the 5th Congress of Deputies (Spain)
Members of the 6th Congress of Deputies (Spain)
Members of the 7th Congress of Deputies (Spain)
Members of the 8th Congress of Deputies (Spain)
Members of the 9th Congress of Deputies (Spain)
Members of the 10th Congress of Deputies (Spain)
Members of the 11th Congress of Deputies (Spain)
Members of the 12th Congress of Deputies (Spain)
Members of the 2nd Cortes of Castilla–La Mancha
Members of the Cortes of Castilla–La Mancha from Guadalajara
Members of the 4th Senate of Spain
Members of the 13th Senate of Spain
Members of the 14th Senate of Spain
People's Party (Spain) politicians